Eley Industrial Estate is in Edmonton, London. Bordered by the Angel Road which is part of the North Circular Road A406 road, the River Lee Navigation, and the Lea Valley Lines railway line. The estate is named after Eley Brothers who manufactured firearms cartridges here.

Today 
The estate is now mostly used for warehousing and retail outlets. The former B&I Nathan furniture factory is now used to manufacture the Parker Knoll range of furniture. Coca-Cola are a major employer with a manufacturing plant on the estate.

The estate still has some functional brick built factories from the 1950s.

External links
Edmonton:Economic History Online fn54

References 

Buildings and structures in the London Borough of Enfield
Edmonton, London